Carolyn Merchant (born July 12, 1936 in Rochester, New York) is an American ecofeminist philosopher and historian of science most famous for her theory (and book of the same title) on The Death of Nature, whereby she identifies the Scientific Revolution of the seventeenth century as the period when science began to atomize, objectify, and dissect nature, foretelling its eventual conception as composed of inert atomic particles. Her works are important in the development of environmental history and the history of science.  She is Distinguished Professor Emerita of Environmental History, Philosophy, and Ethics at UC Berkeley.

Education and career 
In 1954, as a high school senior, Merchant was among the Top Ten Finalists for the Westinghouse Science Talent Search. She received her A.B. in Chemistry from Vassar College in 1958.

She then went to the University of Wisconsin–Madison to earn an M.A. and Ph.D. in the History of Science. There, she was one of the first to be awarded the E. B. Fred Fellowship, to demonstrate that women could make significant contributions to professional fields. In 1963, Merchant, along with 13 other women out of a pool of 114 applicants, was awarded a three-year grant to fund field non-specific graduate research.

She was a lecturer in the History of Science, Department of Physics and Natural Sciences Interdisciplinary Program at the University of San Francisco from 1969 to 1974, assistant professor from 1974–76, and associate professor from 1976–78. She was a visiting professor at Oregon State University in the History of Science Department and General Science Department in 1969.

Merchant has been a member of the History of Science Society since 1962. From 1971–1972, she was co-president of the West Coast History of Science Society. She was chair of the Committee on Women of Science from 1973–1974 and co-chair from 1992–1994. She has been a member of the American Society for Environmental History since 1980 and has held positions such as vice-president and president in addition to serving as associate Editor of the Environmental Review and as a member of the Rachel Carson Prize Committee for best dissertation.

In 1984, she was a Fulbright Senior Scholar at the University of Umeå in Umeå, Sweden, where she taught in the Department of History of Ideas.

In 1979, she became Assistant Professor of Environmental History, Philosophy, and Ethics, at the University of California, Berkeley, Associate Professor in 1980, and Full Professor in 1986. She retired in 2018 and since then has been Professor of the Graduate School at UC Berkeley.

Merchant has been a Guggenheim fellow; a Fulbright scholar; a two-time fellow at the Center for Advanced Study in the Behavioral Sciences, Stanford; a fellow at the National Humanities Center, Research Triangle Park, NC; a member of the Institute for Advanced Study, Princeton; and an American Association for the Advancement of Science fellow. She has presented over 360 lectures in the United States, Canada, Europe, Brazil, and Australia. There are over 230 reviews and discussions of books written by Carolyn Merchant.

In 1971 Merchant was one of the first women to be invited to join the exclusive History of Science Dinner Club at Berkeley.

The Death of Nature 
The Death of Nature: Women, Ecology and the Scientific Revolution (1st edition, 1980; 2nd edition, 1990; 3rd edition, 2020) is Merchant's most well-known book. In this book, she emphasizes the importance of gender in the historiography of modern science. Additionally, she focuses her book on "the sexist assumptions that informed sixteenth- and seventeenth-century conceptions of the universe and human physiology." Merchant expresses the importance of gender in early modern writing on nature, and the use of environmental, social, and literary history as a context for the history of science.

The book has been translated into the following languages: Japanese (1985), German (1987, 1994, 2020), Italian (1988), Swedish (1994), Chinese (1999), Korean (2005), Spanish (2020), French (2020), and Portuguese (2021). There is also a CD collection read by Juliet Jones for HarperAudio (2020).

Philosophy 

Merchant argues that prior to the Scientific Revolution of the seventeenth century, nature was conceived of as the benevolent mother of all things, albeit sometimes wild. This metaphor was gradually replaced by the "domination of nature" model as the Scientific Revolution rationalized and dissected nature to show all her secrets. As nature revealed her secrets, so too she was able to be controlled. Both this intention and the metaphor of "nature unveiled" are still prevalent in scientific language. Conceptions of the Earth as a nurturing bringer of life began slowly to change to one of a resource to be exploited as science became more confident that human minds could know all there was about the natural world and thereby effect changes on it at will.

The female earth was central to organic cosmology that was undermined by the Scientific Revolution and the rise of a market-oriented culture ... for sixteenth-century Europeans the root metaphor binding together the self, society and the cosmos was that of an organism ... organismic theory emphasized interdependence among the parts of the human body, subordination of individual to communal purposes in family, community, and state, and vital life permeate the cosmos to the lowliest stone.

Merchant cites Francis Bacon's use of female metaphors to describe the exploitation of nature at this time: "she is either free, ... or driven out of her ordinary course by the perverseness, insolence and forwardness of matter and violence of impediments ... or she is put in constraint, molded and made as it were new by art and the hand of man; as in things artificial ... nature takes orders from man and works under his authority". Nature must be "bound into service" and made a slave to the human ends of regaining our dominion over nature lost in the "fall from grace" in Eden.

In combination with increasing industrialization and the rise of capitalism that simultaneously replaced women's work such as weaving with machinery, and subsumed their roles as subsistence agriculturists, these changes also drove people to live in cities, further removing them from nature and the effects of industrialized production on it. The combined effects of industrialization, scientific exploration of nature, and the ascendancy of the dominion/domination metaphor over that of a nurturing Mother Earth, according to Merchant, can still be felt in social and political thought, as much as it was evident in the art, philosophy, and science of the seventeenth century.

Legacy of The Death of Nature 
Merchant’s The Death of Nature leaves a scholarly legacy in the fields of environmental history, philosophy, and feminism. The book is considered groundbreaking due to her connection between the feminization of nature and the naturalization of women. Along with this connection, she backs up her claim with historical evidence during the time of enlightenment. However, Merchant was not the first to present ecofeminist ideals and theories. Françoise d'Eaubonne coined the term ecofeminisme to portray the influence of women and their ability to generate an ecological revolution in her 1974 book Le Feminisme ou la Mort. Susan Griffin's 1978 book Woman and Nature: The Roaring Inside Her, which also talks about women and ecology, was written just before the Death of Nature. The Death of Nature is influential despite these earlier works because it is the first interpretation of an ecofeminist perspective on the history of ecology.

Additional books

Ecological Revolutions: Nature, Gender, and Science in New England (1989, 2010) 
Carolyn Merchant’s Ecological Revolutions explores the stages of ecological transformation that took place in New England as European settlers took control of the land. The resulting “colonial ecological revolution” was to hold sway until roughly the time of American independence, when the onset of industrialization and increasing urbanization brought about the “capitalist ecological revolution.” By the late nineteenth century, Merchant argues, New England had become a society that viewed the whole ecosphere as an arena for human domination.

Radical Ecology: The Search for a Livable World (1992, 2005, 2007), Korean translation (2001) 
In Radical Ecology, Merchant argues that laws, regulations, and scientific research alone cannot reverse the spread of pollution or restore dwindling resources. In order to maintain a livable world, we must formulate new social, economic, scientific, and spiritual approaches that will fundamentally transform human relationships with nature. She analyzes the revolutionary ideas of visionary ecologists and examines their efforts to bring environmental problems to the attention of the public. She explores the problems, ideas, and actions that will make society rethink, reconstruct, and reinvent its relationships with non-human nature in search of a livable world.

Earthcare: Women and the Environment (1996) 
Merchant’s Earthcare challenges humanity to revise the ways the Western world has produced, reproduced, and conceptualized its past relations with nature, and suggests a new partnership ethic of environmentalism which men and women alike can embrace. It argues that a cooperative approach will help to create a habitable, sustainable world.

Reinventing Eden: The Fate of Nature in Western Culture (2003, 2013) 
In Reinventing Eden, Carolyn Merchant traces the Garden of Eden myth from the Mesopotamian region, where agriculture—and the creation myth—first began, through the Greek and Roman empires, the Enlightenment, and the modern capitalist world. We must consider nature as an independent agent capable of autonomous action. We need to work with nature, balancing our needs and desires with those of the natural world, to include green political parties, sustainable development, and a partnership between humans and the earth.

American Environmental History: An Introduction (2007) 
By studying the many ways diverse peoples have changed, shaped, and conserved the natural world over time, Carolyn Merchant’s American Environmental History provides insights into humanity’s unique relationship with nature and, more importantly, helps us to better understand the origins of our environmental crisis. It addresses issues such as the expulsion of native peoples from national parks, the preservation of the wilderness, and population growth in the light of gender, race, and class.

Autononomous Nature: Problems of Prediction and Control from Ancient Times to the Scientific Revolution (2015) 
Autonomous Nature investigates the history of nature as an active, often unruly force in tension with nature as a rational, logical order from ancient times to the Scientific Revolution of the seventeenth century. Along with subsequent advances in mechanics, hydrodynamics, thermodynamics, and electromagnetism, nature came to be perceived as an orderly, rational, physical world that could be engineered, controlled, and managed. This book focuses on the history of unpredictability, why it was a problem for the ancient world through the Scientific Revolution, and why it is a problem for today.

Spare the Birds! George Bird Grinnell and the First Audubon Society (2016) 
In 1887, a year after founding the Audubon Society, explorer and conservationist George Bird Grinnell launched Audubon Magazine. The magazine constituted one of the first efforts to preserve bird species decimated by the women’s hat trade, hunting, and loss of habitat. Within two years, however, for practical reasons, Grinnell dissolved both the magazine and the society. Remarkably, Grinnell’s mission was soon revived by women and men who believed in it, and the work continues today. Spare the Birds! presents the exceptional story of George Bird Grinnell and his writings and legacy. It features Grinnell’s biographies of ornithologists John James Audubon and Alexander Wilson and his editorials and descriptions of Audubon’s bird paintings.

Science and Nature: Past, Present and Future (2018) 
Science and Nature brings together the work and insights of Carolyn Merchant on the history of science, environmental history, and ethics. The book explores her ideas about the interconnections among science, women, nature, and history as they have emerged over her academic lifetime. Focusing on topics such as The Death of Nature, the Scientific Revolution, women in the history of science and environment, and partnership ethics, it synthesizes her writings and sets out a vision for the twenty-first century.

The Anthropocene and the Humanities (2020) 
The Anthropocene and the Humanities focuses on the original concept of the Anthropocene first proposed by Paul Crutzen and Eugene Stoermer in their foundational 2000 paper. Here they argued that the Anthropocene—The Age of Humanity—was launched in 1766 with the invention of James Watt’s version of the steam engine, making possible steam engines, steam boats, trains, and factories, and ultimately leading to automobiles and airplanes. Using history, art, literature, religion, philosophy, ethics, and justice as the focal points, Merchant traces key figures and developments in the humanities throughout the Anthropocene era and explores how these disciplines might influence sustainability in the next century.

Edited books

Major Problems in American Environmental History (1993, 2004, 2012) 
In this edited book, Carolyn Merchant introduces students to primary sources and analytical essays by well-known environmental historians on important topics in U.S. environmental history from native American times to the present. It asks students to evaluate primary sources, test the interpretations of distinguished historians and others, and draw their own conclusions. Each chapter of Major Problems in American Environmental History includes a map that situates the topic within a place and era, along with suggestions for further reading.

Key Concepts in Critical Theory: Ecology (1994, 2008) 
Starting with an examination of the use of modernist thought as legitimation for the domination of nature, this collection of essays progresses on a broad front: it examines how First-World economies create Third-World dependency; the connections between poverty and population; how basic needs could be fulfilled in a green sustainable economy; the debate between deep, social, and socialist ecologists over the new ecological worldview; ecofeminism and the liberation of both women and nature; environmental justice for minorities and Third-World peoples; the need for new spiritual relations between people and nature; and a new postmodern science that offers people a partnership with nature. The conclusion of Key Concepts in Critical Theory: Ecology presents the “Principles of Environmental Justice,” adopted by the First National People of Color Environmental Leadership Summit.

Green Versus Gold: Sources in California’s Environmental History (1998) 
Green Versus Gold is an edited book that provides a compelling look at California’s environmental history from its Native American past to conflicts and movements of recent decades. It brings together a large storehouse of primary sources and interpretative essays to create a comprehensive picture of the history of ecological and human interactions in one of the nation’s most diverse and resource-rich states.

Encyclopedia of World Environmental History, 3 vols. (2004), co-edited with Shepherd Krech III, and John McNeill 
While the relationship between humanity and nature has been a constant feature of the human situation, the human impact on the environment has only recently become a topic of general interest to students, as well as to scholars and professionals in disciplines across the board. This co-edited three-volume set provides not only broad historical coverage on how human beliefs and actions have altered the natural world, but also covers the latest developments in the field. The Encyclopedia of World Environmental History also includes an analysis of natural phenomena and events and their impact on human societies.

After the Death of Nature: Carolyn Merchant and the Future of Human-Nature Relations (2018) 
A festschrift honoring Carolyn Merchant’s work, After the Death of Nature, edited by Kenneth Worthy, Elizabeth Allison, and Whitney A. Bauman, appeared in 2018. This book examines and builds on Carolyn Merchant’s legacy of environmental thought and her critical responses to modern mechanistic and patriarchal conceptions of nature and women, as well as her systematic taxonomies of environmental thought and action. Scholars featured in the book assess, praise, critique, and extend her work to arrive at a more extended understanding of the human place in nature today. The book examines and builds on Carolyn Merchant’s decades-long legacy of innovative environmental thought and her critical responses to modern mechanistic and patriarchal conceptions of nature and women, as well as her systematic taxonomies of environmental thought and action. The ideas hold the potential for healthier and more just relations with nature and among peoples in the future.

Carolyn Merchant has also written more than 100 single-authored research articles. A symposium honoring her work was held in 2018.

List of publications 

 The Death of Nature: Women, Ecology and the Scientific Revolution (1980, 2e 1990, 3e 2020). Review by Paula Findlen.
 Ecological Revolutions: Nature, Gender, and Science in New England (1989, 2010)
 Radical Ecology: The Search for a Livable World (1992, 2005)
Major Problems in American Environmental History (1993, 2004, 2012, editor)
Key Concepts in Critical Theory: Ecology (1994, 2008, editor)
 Earthcare: Women and the Environment (1996)
 Green Versus Gold: Sources in California’s Environmental History (1998, editor)
Columbia Guide to American Environmental History (2002)
 Reinventing Eden: The Fate of Nature in Western Culture (2003, 2013)
Encyclopedia of World Environmental History, 3 vols. (2004, co-editor)
 American Environmental History: An Introduction (2007)
 Autonomous Nature: Problems of Prediction and Control from Ancient Times to the Scientific Revolution (2015)
Spare the Birds! George Bird Grinnell and the First Audubon Society (2016)
Science and Nature: Past, Present and Future (2018)
The Anthropocene and the Humanities (2020)

See also
 List of ecofeminist authors
 Debora Hammond
 Georg Agricola
 John Muir
 Romanticism in science

References

Further reading
 
Carolyn Merchant’s webpage.
Findlen, Paula. “Science Turned Upside Down: Carolyn Merchant’s Vision of Nature, 40 Years Latter.” Public Books, January 22, 2021.

External links
 "Environmentalism: From the Control of Nature to Partnership", video lecture

1936 births
Living people
Feminist studies scholars
Ecofeminists
American activists
Green thinkers
Writers from Rochester, New York
Historians of science
Environmental historians
Activists from Rochester, New York
Presidents of the American Society for Environmental History